Uttar Pradesh State Highway 83 (UP SH 83) passes through NH 34 - Kurawali (Mainpuri district) - Mainpuri city - Agra Lucknow Expressway - Karhal town - Saifai village - NH 19 - Etawah city and covers a distance of 52.8 km.

Uttar Pradesh state in India has a series of road networks.

See also
 State highway
 State Highway (India)
 Mainpuri district
 NH 34
 Mainpuri city 
 Agra Lucknow Expressway
 Saifai village 
 NH 19
 Etawah city
 Etawah district
 Etawah Safari Park

References

External links
 State Highway 83 on Google Maps

Mainpuri district
Saifai
Etawah district
Transport in Saifai
State Highways in Uttar Pradesh